Sergio Fernández Prendes (born 15 July 1986) is a Spanish former professional footballer who played as a left winger.

Club career
Born in Gijón, Asturias, Sergio began his senior career with hometown's Sporting de Gijón, but spent the vast majority of his six-year spell with their reserves, playing three of his four seasons in the Tercera División. In September 2009, following his release, he signed with neighbouring CD Cudillero in the same league.

In the 2010–11 campaign, Prendes continued competing in his native region and division four, scoring three goals in 28 games to help Marino de Luanco to promote to Segunda División B. In July 2012 he joined CD Alcoyano, but moved to AD Alcorcón shortly after due to a release clause in his contract with his previous club.

Prendes made his Segunda División debut on 8 September 2012, playing roughly 20 minutes in a 3–1 away win against UD Las Palmas. He scored his first professional goal on 28 September of the following year, opening the 2–0 home victory over Deportivo Alavés.

On 18 August 2014, Prendes signed for fellow second-tier CD Leganés. He moved abroad for the first time in his career in July 2015, with Mexican team Atlético San Luis.

Prendes joined Maltese Premier League's Tarxien Rainbows F.C. in the summer of 2016. He subsequently returned to his country's lower leagues.

References

External links

La Segunda B profile 

1986 births
Living people
Spanish footballers
Footballers from Gijón
Association football midfielders
Segunda División players
Segunda División B players
Tercera División players
Sporting de Gijón B players
Marino de Luanco footballers
CD Alcoyano footballers
AD Alcorcón footballers
CD Leganés players
Caudal Deportivo footballers
San Luis F.C. players
Maltese Premier League players
Tarxien Rainbows F.C. players
Spanish expatriate footballers
Expatriate footballers in Mexico
Expatriate footballers in Malta
Spanish expatriate sportspeople in Mexico
Spanish expatriate sportspeople in Malta